Northwest Arctic Borough School District (NWABSD) is a school district headquartered in Kotzebue, Alaska.

In 1999 the district had 2,100 students in nine communities. Beginning circa 1999 the Anchorage company Education Resources Inc. was scheduled to enter a contract with NWABSD so that an employee of the company would act as the superintendent of the school district.

The current superintendent is Terri Walker. One previous superintendent, Mike Dunleavy, is currently serving as governor of Alaska.

Schools
Kotzebue:
 June Nelson Elementary School (JNES)
  it had 394 students, making it the largest school in the district.
 Kotzebue Middle High School (KMHS)
 Star of the Northwest Magnet School

Rural K-12 schools:
 Ambler School
 Buckland (Nunatchiaq) School
 Deering School
 Kiana School
 McQueen School - Kivalina
 Kobuk School
 Napaaqtugmiut School - Noatak
 Aqaaluk Noorvik School
 Davis-Ramoth Memorial School - Selawik
 Shungnak School

Other facilities:
 Alaska Technical Center - Kotzebue
 NWABSD Home School

References

External links
 

School districts in Alaska
Northwest Arctic Borough, Alaska